Clark Township is a township in Chariton County, in the U.S. state of Missouri.

Clark Township has the name of Henry Clark, a pioneer citizen.

References

Townships in Missouri
Townships in Chariton County, Missouri